Chryseofusus jurgeni is a species of sea snail, a marine gastropod mollusk in the family Fasciolariidae, the spindle snails, the tulip snails and their allies.

Description
The length of the shell attains 94.2 mm.

Distribution
This marine species occurs off southern Madagascar and Mozambique.

References

 Hadorn R. & Fraussen K. (2002) Two new Fusinus from East Africa (Gastropoda: Fasciolariidae). Iberus 20(1): 63–72.
 Hadorn R. & Fraussen K. (2003) The deep-water Indo-Pacific radiation of Fusinus (Chryseofusus subgen. nov.) (Gastropoda: Fasciolariidae). Iberus 21(1): 207–240.

Fasciolariidae
Gastropods described in 2002